The Best of Peter Green's Fleetwood Mac is a compilation album by British blues rock band Fleetwood Mac released in November 2002 and focusing on the Peter Green years. The album serves as a digitally remastered replacement for the band's Greatest Hits, with the remastering and cover art taken from the 1999 box set The Complete Blue Horizon Sessions 1967–1969.

The disc contains every single by the band released in the United Kingdom during the years 1968 to 1971 with the exception of their joint single credited also to Otis Spann, although the band's cover of "Need Your Love So Bad" is a longer outtake rather than the UK single version. That single's B-side does appear, as does the B-side to "Oh Well (Part 1)" without the edit separating the track from its A-side. Only two tracks do not feature Green: "Dragonfly" recorded after Green left; and "I'd Rather Go Blind" by Chicken Shack featuring future Fleetwood Mac member Christine McVie. The second version of "Albatross" ending the disc derives from a 2002 recording by DJ Chris Coco. All other tracks appeared on album.

Track listing

Personnel
Peter Green — vocals, guitars, harmonica
Jeremy Spencer — slide guitar, vocals, piano
Danny Kirwan — guitars, vocals
John McVie — bass guitar
Mick Fleetwood — drums
Christine McVie — vocals, keyboards on "Dragonfly" and "I'd Rather Go Blind"
Stan Webb, Andy Silvester, Dave Bidwell (Chicken Shack) — instruments on "I'd Rather Go Blind"

References

External links
 Allmusic review.

2002 greatest hits albums
Fleetwood Mac compilation albums